2K Games (Shanghai) Co., Ltd., doing business as 2K China (formerly 2K Shanghai), was a Chinese video game developer based in Shanghai.

History 
2K Shanghai was founded as a subsidiary of 2K on 9 May 2006, in response to China's rapidly growing gaming market. Initial projects for the company included doing Chinese localisation for Civilization IV, developing an original intellectual property, and "serve as a hub for sales, marketing, development and outsourcing opportunities in China".

On 6 November 2015, 2K's parent company, Take-Two Interactive, announced that they had closed down 2K China due to profitability concerns over their in-development title Borderlands Online. Due to the closure, Borderlands Online was effectively cancelled. 150 people were made redundant at 2K China and its Hangzhou studio, while the Chengdu studio, as 2K Chengdu, was retained as a quality assurance facility.

Games developed

References 

2K (company)
Chinese companies disestablished in 2015
Chinese companies established in 2006
Defunct video game companies of China
Take-Two Interactive divisions and subsidiaries
Video game companies disestablished in 2015
Video game companies established in 2006
Video game development companies